CA Technologies, Inc., formerly Computer Associates International, Inc., and CA, Inc., was an American multinational enterprise software developer and published based in New York City. In 2018, the company was acquired by Broadcom Inc. for nearly $19 billion.

History

1970s
The company was established by Charles Wang and Russell Artzt in 1976. In 1976, it obtained exclusive North American distribution rights for CA-Sort, a sort/merge/copy and data management utility software program. 

Wang and Artzt built their first corporate headquarters in 1979 located at 23 Orchard Road in Skillman, New Jersey.

Wang and Artzt established a partnership with Sam Goodner and Max Sevcik of Swiss company Computer Associates, which they named Computer Associates International, and went to market with CA-Sort, along with their original products.

1980s
Computer Associates had an IPO in 1981 that garnered the company a modest $3.2 million.  Its stock traded on the NASDAQ using the stock symbol "CASI".

The first significant acquisition in CA's history took place in 1982, when it merged with Capex Corporation, resulting in a 50 percent increase in CA's revenues. Both CA and Capex made software products for the IBM mainframe, but while by CA's own marketing statements CA had visibility and success in software products for IBM's DOS mainframe operating system, potential customers did not think CA was strong in products for the IBM OS mainframe operating system. In constrast, this was an area where Capex had established itself.

The acquisition of Capex was generally viewed as having been successful. It was the start of what was to become a buying spree for Computer Associates over the next several years. CA's strategy for growth reached a new level with its deal for Uccel in 1987, which valued at $800 million was an order of magnitude larger than any of its previous acquisitions. Of Uccel's existing staff of 1,200 people, 550 were let go; this kind of harsh post-acquisition reduction measure was typical for the company and became a part of CA's public image.

In 1987, CA's stock began trading on the New York Stock Exchange using the ticker symbol "CA". In 1988, the company purchased the principal software product of Consco. 

As the decade ended, CA became the first software company after Microsoft to exceed $1 billion in sales.

1990s

Early in the decade, CA was forced to address criticism of the company as well as a sharp decline in its stock price, which fell more than 50% during 1990. The ensuing changes included pushing into foreign markets (Japan, Canada, Africa, Latin America), reforming how the company charged its customers for software maintenance, and improving compatibility with products from other vendors, such as Hewlett-Packard (HP), Apple Computer, and Digital Equipment Corporation (DEC). By 1991, CA had $1.4 billion in sales.

In 1994, CA acquired the ASK Group and continued to offer the Ingres database management system under a variety of brand names.

In 1992, the company was sued by Electronic Data Systems (EDS), a CA customer. EDS accused CA of breach of contract, misuse of copyright and violations of antitrust laws. CA filed a counterclaim, also alleging breach of contract, including copyright infringement and misappropriation of trade secrets. The companies reached a settlement in 1996.

In 1995, Legent Corporation was acquired for $1.78 billion, the biggest-ever acquisition in the software industry at that time, and Cheyenne Software for $1.2 billion in 1996. CA executed the software industry's then-largest acquisition ($3.5 billion) via Platinum Technology International in 1999.

In 1998, an unsuccessful and hostile takeover bid by CA for computer consulting firm Computer Sciences Corporation (CSC) prompted a bribery suit by CSC's chairman Van Honeycutt against CA's founder and then CEO, Charles Wang.

In 1999, Wang received the largest bonus in history at that time from a public company. The receipt of a $670 million stock grant that dated to the vesting of a 1995 stock option occurred while the company faced a slowdown in European markets and an economic slump in Asia, both of which had affected CA's earnings and stock price. In total, the company took a $675 million after-tax charge for $1.1 billion in payouts to Wang and other top CA executives.

2000s

By 2000, CA had acquired about 200 companies. At this time, the U.S. Department of Justice limited CA's acquisitions. The company refinanced large amounts of debt, and a proxy battle ensued between the board and shareholders. There were also questions regarding executive compensation, accounting methods, and insider-trading by its then CEO and chairman, Sanjay Kumar.  In May 1998 stock grants were issued to Mr. Wang, Mr. Artz and Mr. Kumar together worth $1.1 billion at the time.

In 2000, a shareholder-based class-action lawsuit accused CA of misstating more than $500 million in revenue in its 1998 and 1999 fiscal years in order to artificially inflate its stock price. An investigation by the Securities and Exchange Commission (SEC) followed, resulting in charges against the company and some of its former top executives. The SEC alleged that from 1998 to 2000, CA routinely kept its books open to include quarterly revenue from contracts executed after the quarter ended in order to meet Wall Street analysts' expectations. In 2004, the company avoided indictment for involvement in the 35 day month accounting scandal by reaching a settlement with the SEC and Department of Justice, in which CA agreed to pay $225 million in restitution to shareholders and reform its corporate governance and financial accounting controls. Eight CA executives pleaded guilty to fraud charges – most notably, former CEO and chairman Sanjay Kumar, who received a 12-year prison sentence for orchestrating the scandal. The company subsequently made sweeping changes through virtually all of its senior leadership positions.

In 2000, Sanjay Kumar replaced Charles Wang as chief executive officer. In 2002, Kumar became chairman of Computer Associates' board of directors.  In 2006, he was sentenced to 12 years in prison and fined $8 million for his role in a massive accounting fraud at Computer Associates.

CA started the India Technology Centre in Hyderabad on December 10, 2003. In 2004, CA appointed ex-IBM employee John Swainson as CEO, who held the position until retirement at the end of 2009.

2010s

In 2010, the company acquired eight companies to support its cloud computing strategy: 3Tera, Nimsoft, NetQoS, Oblicore, Cassatt, 4Base Technology, Arcot Systems, and Hyperformix. In 2011, CA acquired ITKO for $330 million. Two years later, it acquired app deployment and management company Nolio for approximately $40 million, as well as Layer7.

On January 7, 2013, CA Technologies announced that Michael P. Gregoire would be a member of the board and new chief executive officer. In June 2014, CA Technologies moved its headquarters, without an announcement, from Islandia in Suffolk County, to 520 Madison Avenue in New York City.

In 2015, the company made four acquisitions, including Rally software for $480 million, Unifyalm, Gridtools, Idmlogic, and Xceedium.

In 2016, CA acquired Blazemeter, Automic, Veracode, and Runscope in 2017.

On August 8, 2018, CEO Mike Gregoire was elected as chairman of CA Technologies board of directors, replacing retiring chairman Art Weinbach.

On July 11, 2018, Broadcom Inc. announced it would acquire the company for $18.9 billion in cash. The acquisition was completed on November 5, 2018. After the acquisition, Broadcom laid off former CA Technology workers in Silicon Valley and Plano, TX. It also laid off 262 former CA Technology employees in Islandia, and some in Manhattan.

Corporate responsibility and recognition

Sustainability 
In 2010, CA was listed among the greenest companies by Newsweek's Green rankings. CA has been named a component of the Dow Jones Sustainability Indexes (DJSI) for seven years, from 2012 to 2018. In 2015 and 2016, CA was ranked as one of America's Greenest companies by Newsweek.

In 2017, the company scored an A− from CDP, the world's most comprehensive rating of companies leading on environmental action, for environmental performance and disclosure.

According to a corporate sustainability report released by the company in 2018, CA reduced its Greenhouse Gas Footprint by more than 35% since 2006. It received the Climate Leadership Award in Excellence in GHG Management in 2018, and was included in Barron's 100 Most Sustainable Companies in 2018 as well.

In February 2018, CA was named one of the World's Most Ethical Companies by Ethisphere Institute for the third consecutive year.

Equality and diversity 
CA Technologies was named one of the best companies for multicultural women by Working Mother Magazine for four consecutive years, from 2015 to 2018 as well as one of the 100 Best Companies from 2015 to 2017. The company was also awarded 4.3 of 5 stars by InHerSight as one of the Top 10 IT Companies for Women in 2017. In 2015 and 2016, Fatherly.com ranked CA as one of the Best Places to Work for New Dads.

In 2018, CA was named a NAFE top company for executive women. CA was also included in the Bloomberg Gender-Equality Index (GEI) in 2018.

In 2018, for the fourth consecutive year, the Human Rights Campaign Foundation ranked CA as one of the Best Places to Work for LGBTQ+ Equality.

CA CEO Mike Gregoire is a signatory of the CEO Action for Diversity and Inclusion pledge.

Work environments 
For four consecutive years, 2015–2018, CA was named by Computerworld as one of the Best Places to Work in IT. In 2017, it was named to the Forbes list of America's Best Employers and recognized with a STAR Award for Leadership and Innovation by the Technology Services Industry Association (TSIA).

In 2018, CA was named to the Thomson Reuters World's Top 100 Technology companies and for six consecutive years has been the recipient of the NorthFace ScoreBoard Award from Customer Relationship Management Institute (CRMI).

Acquisitions

CA had a long history of acquisitions in the software industry. It grew its portfolio and became successful through acquiring many companies in disparate fields, including system monitoring and management, ID management, security, and anti-virus, among others.

See also

Further reading
21st Century Management: The Revolutionary Strategies That Have Made Computer Associates a Multibillion-Dollar Software Giant, by Hesh Kestin,  (1992, Atlantic Monthly Press)

External links

References

 
Broadcom
1976 establishments in New York (state)
2018 disestablishments in New York (state)
1980s initial public offerings
2018 mergers and acquisitions
American companies established in 1976
American companies disestablished in 2018
Companies formerly listed on the Nasdaq
Defunct software companies of the United States
Enterprise software
Financial technology companies
Software companies established in 1976
Software companies disestablished in 2018
Website monitoring software